Officially named as "The Hits Tour" during 2014 (as in 2012–2013) and later renamed as "Deja Vu Tour" in 2015, is a series of concerts performed by Mexican artist Luis Miguel to perform a brand new setlist consisting of his earliest hits (80's and 90's) as well as his most recent hits included in productions such as México En La Piel (2004) and Luis Miguel (2010). Even though, in 2014 the USA Tour advertising mentioned it as "Tour 2014" and the Sudamerican advertising as "The Show" these were not the tour official names. Along with the tour start date (September 12, 2014) the single "Deja Vu" came out, it can be inferred that this is the reason why the tour was renamed as "Deja Vu".

History

This tour began in Las Vegas with four concerts as part of the celebration of the proclamation of independence of Mexico. He appeared in the following cities: Phoenix, San Diego, Inglewood and Oakland for a total of nine concerts in United States. Then travels to Mexico to present themselves for first time in the "Palenque" of Guadalajara with four shows.

In October returns to Chile (Santiago and Viña del Mar), Argentina (Buenos Aires, Rosario, Córdoba, Mendoza, Tucumán and Posadas) and Paraguay for a total of 16 presentations. In January 2015 begins its season of concerts in Mexico.

Tour set list 
(names taken from the official Staff list)

Tour dates

Cancelled shows

Awards and records

 On October 25, 2014 he was named "distinguished guest" by the city of Buenos Aires; Certificate and gold medal for record of performances in Buenos Aires (1982–2014).
 On September 11, 2015 is awarded by The Utah Office Of The Attorney General with a recognition plaque for his years of music.

Band

Acoustic & Electric guitar: Todd Robinson
Bass: Lalo Carrillo
Piano: Francisco Loyo
Keyboards & Programming: Salo Loyo
Drums: Victor Loyo
Percussion: Tommy Aros (2014)
Percussion: Armando Espinosa "Pinaca"
Saxophone: Jeff Nathanson
Trumpet: Ramón Flores
Trumpet: Peter Olstad (2014)
Trumpet: Brad Steinwehe
Trombone: Alejandro Carballo
Backing vocals: Kasia Sowinska (2014).
Backing vocals: Paula Peralta (2014–2015).

Notes

References

External links
 Official site.

Luis Miguel concert tours
2014 concert tours
2015 concert tours